Ramphotyphlops mansuetus, also known as the small-headed blind snake, is a species of blind snake that is native to the Solomon Islands archipelago. The specific epithet mansuetus is Latin for “tame”.

Distribution and habitat
The type locality is Makira (San Cristobal) in the Solomon Islands. The snake has also been collected on Bougainville Island, politically part of Papua New Guinea.

References

 
mansuetus
Reptiles of the Solomon Islands
Endemic fauna of the Solomon Islands
Natural history of Bougainville Island
Taxa named by Thomas Barbour
Reptiles described in 1921